Richard Swedberg (born 18 May 1948) is a Swedish sociologist. He is currently Professor Emeritus at the Department of Sociology at Cornell University.

Education 
He received a PhD in sociology from Boston College (1978); he also holds a law degree ("juris kandidat") from Stockholm University (1970).

Research 
Swedberg's two specialties are social theory and economic sociology. The focus in his work on social theory is currently on theorizing or how to learn to theorize.

Publications 
So far he has produced a monograph on theory, with practical instructions for how to theorize (The Art of Social Theory, Princeton University Press, 2014) and an anthology (Theorizing in the Social Sciences: The Context of Discovery, Stanford University Press, 2014). Swedberg is also the co-author, together with Peter Hedstrom, of Social Mechanisms (1998, Cambridge University Press). As to economic sociology, he has been a contributor to this field since its renewal in the mid-1980s ("new economic sociology"). Swedberg has written extensively on the works by Max Weber and Joseph Schumpeter and is currently working on the financial crisis. He is the author of e.g. Economics and Sociology (1990; Princeton University Press), Max Weber and the Idea of Economic Sociology (1998, Princeton University Press) and Tocqueville's Political Economy (2009, Princeton University Press). His edited work includes The Economics and Sociology of Capitalism, Handbook of Economic Sociology (with Neil Smelser) (1994, 2005, Russell Sage Foundation & Princeton University Press) and Sociology of Economic Life (with Mark Granovetter (1992, 2001, 2011, Westview). His vitae as well as some of his writings are available at his webpage at Cornell University.

Honours 
On 29 January 2016 Swedberg received an honorary doctorate from the Faculty of Social Sciences at Uppsala University for his insights in "how useful the work of classical thinkers can be in understanding contemporary society".

References

External links 
 Cornell University Faculty Page
 Curriculum Vitae of Richard Swedberg
 Online papers of Richard Swedberg

Morrissey College of Arts & Sciences alumni
Cornell University faculty
Living people
Stockholm University alumni
Swedish sociologists
1948 births